Šokci are a South Slavic ethnic group native to historical regions of Baranya, Bačka, Slavonia and Syrmia. These regions today span eastern Croatia, southwestern Hungary, and northern Serbia. They primarily self-identify as a subgroup of Croats and therefore they are not considered a separate ethnicity in Croatia and elsewhere.

Population 
Šokci are considered to be a native population of Slavonia and Syrmia in Croatia. The Croatian Bureau of Statistics does not record the Šokci as a separate ethnicity (2001). According to the 2011 census in Serbia, 607 people declared as ethnic Šokci. Outside of Slavonia and Syrmia, they live in the settlements of Bački Monoštor, Sonta, Sombor, Bački Breg in the Serbian Bačka, and Hercegszántó in Hungary.

Ethnonym 
The term Šokac (masculine), Šokica and Šokčica (feminine), is used for the part of Croatian Ikavian speakers native in Slavonia, Baranja, Bačka and Bosnia. The oldest documents are from 1644–1698, 1702 (population of Đakovo Diocese), katolici, Šokci jali Slovinci ... Šokci rehuć Slovinci katolici. In Croatia, particularly in Lika it is opposed to term Vlachs (for Orthodox Serbs), and the Serbs pejoratively use it for the Croats. Denominal šokčiti ("Catholicize"), šoketati ("to speak Ikavian"). Eastern Slavonia and western Syrmia in Croatia is often referred to as Šokadija ("land of the Šokci"), although the term is not geographically limited, it is rather a general moniker for the Šokac "ancestral land". The ethnonym is of unknown etymological derivation, and there are several hypotheses on the origin:

Matija Petar Katančić (1750–1825), the first to theorize on the name, connected the ethnonym with the toponym of Succi or Succus in Thrace, found in the work of Ammianus Marcellinus (fl. 353–378). He also derived it from šljivov sok (plum juice). Ćiro Truhelka derived it from Albanian shoq < Latin sočius, but comparison to Montenegrin surname Šoć makes it dismissive. Others, including Vuk Karadžić, derived it from Italian word sciocco  ("frenzied, insane"). F. Kluge (1924) derived it from German schock, "a detachment of 60 men", which was the size of historical border patrols on the Sava. V. Skarić (1932) theorized that it was derived from German der Sachse ("Saxon", sh. Sas), for which there's lack of historical evidence. Petar Skok derived it from Turkish-Persian noun šoh ~ suh ("wicked, shameless, unclean") with suffix "-gin, -kin" ("unclean"). In his unfinished etymological dictionary published in 1973, the editors considered most reasonable the Romanian şoacăţ with primary meaning a mouse, and secondary meaning a mockery for Western Europeans (especially Germans) who dressed in urban fashion, from which derives adjective şoacăfesc (German), abstraction įoacăţie. Other assumptions are from Serbo-Croatian word skok or uskok ("to jump, leap, to jump in"), or from folk etymology šaka ("fist"), from the way they make the sign of the cross which is different from Orthodox's sign with three fingers.

Origin 
The origin of Šokci people is not completely clear. The prevalent opinion of modern scholars, based on etymology, is that they were Catholics who moved from the south, across the Sava from Bosnia, by the end of the Ottoman wars in Europe, as the Ottomans were retreating. The Šokci in Baranja are considered to be descendants of settlers from a mass migration of Croats from an area near Srebrenica, Bosnia into the region after the Ottoman retreat in the 18th century. Šokci are considered to be an autochthonous population of Slavonia and Syrmia, which distinguishes them from the majority of the present-day population of these regions who are descendants of other settlements. The feeling of being indigenous rather than a settler is an important characteristic of the population.

History

17th century
The earliest known Ottoman Turkish defter that mentions the Šokci dates from 1615, a ferman by sultan Ahmed I, dated Safer 9, 1024 according to the Islamic calendar, in which he referred to them as the population of the "Latin faith" whose "religion is completely different from the faith of the Serbs, Greeks and Vlachs". They are also mentioned in the documents of the Roman Catholic Church where they requested Jeronim Lučić to become the bishop of Bosnia and Slavonia in 1635, and in one writing from the time when Eugene of Savoy invaded Ottoman territory down to Sarajevo in 1697.

18th century
In the 1702 census of Đakovo, one of the cities that was retaken from the Ottoman Empire following the Treaty of Karlowitz, there were 500–600 inhabitants described as Catholic Slav/Slavonian. Tadija Smičiklas later republished the same census and used the terms "Slovinci" and/or "Šokci", and claimed 400 inhabitants. According to the contemporary Antun Kanižlić (1699–1766), the term Šokci was a slang reference to Catholic Slavonians that was used by the Orthodox.

According to the Austrian census in Bačka from 1715, Serbs, Bunjevci, and Šokci comprised 97.6% of population. The 1720 census in Bačka recorded 72% Serbs and 22% Bunjevci and Šokci. After the Treaty of Passarowitz (1718), the first Habsburg census recorded in Banat about 20,000 citizens, mostly Serbs.

19th century
In the old Austro-Hungarian censuses there was large number of Šokci, both in Croatia/Slavonia and in Serbia/Vojvodina. According to the 1840 data, the population of Croatia, Slavonia and Serbian Vojvodina numbered 1,605,730 people, of which 777,880 (48%) were Croats, 504,179 (32%) Serbs, and 297,747 (19%) Šokci. The Šokci were concentrated in the Požega, Virovitica, and Syrmia counties, and in the Slavonian Military Frontier.

20th century
According to the 1910 census in Austria-Hungary, there were 88,209 Bunjevci and Šokci in the Hungarian part.

Contemporary

Šokci living in Croatia and Hungary, as well as many of those living in Serbia, today usually consider themselves to be a subgroup of Croats. In Serbia, Šokci and Bunjevci have been recorded as a separate "modality" or national or ethnic affiliation by the national census in 1991 and 2002. Unlike Bunjevci, the other Catholic Slavic group from the same area, Šokci mostly declare themselves as Croats rather than the separate group, and some have also declared themselves Yugoslavs in the census. In the 1991 census, there were 1,922 declared Šokci in what has later become Federal Republic of Yugoslavia, and a much larger number of Croats. The population that declared "Šokci" as an ethnicity in the 2002 census is small and appears in summary lists under "Other", while there were over 70,000 declared Croats. The choice of ethnicity between "Šokac" and "Croat" that is promoted in Serbia is described by scholars in Croatia as bizarre and harmful, because it exacerbates the Šokac myths of independence and antiquity, puts them into the realm of political folklore and helps provoke various 19th-century conflicts between the Croats and the Serbs.

In general, the number and the percentage of the Šokci has decreased because of an unwritten policy that each family should have only one child, because they did not wish to divide their estate and other riches in each following generation. Unfortunately such a practice worked up until the 19th/20th century, at which point they were practically overwhelmed in number by the immigrants which had a much larger reproduction rate (certainly over two children per family at the time).

Villages with numerous Šokac population in the region of Bačka are: Sonta (Apatin municipality), Bački Breg and Bački Monoštor (Sombor municipality). In 2002 census in Serbia, most of the inhabitants of these villages declared themselves as Croats.

Most of the Hungarian Šokci live in the Baranya region, particularly in the town of Mohács.

Religion 

The Šokci are Roman Catholic by faith and follow the Latin Rite.

Language 
The Šokci speak an old-Shtokavian Slavonian sub-dialect that is almost exclusively spoken by Šokci. The Slavonian dialect has a mixed Ikavian and Ekavian accent: Ikavian is predominant in Posavina, Baranja, Bačka and in the Slavonian sub-dialect enclave of Derventa; and Ekavian in Podravina. There are also enclaves of one accent in the territory of the other, and also of mixed Ekavian–Ikavian and Jekavian–Ikavian accents. In some villages in Hungary, the original Slavic yat sound is preserved.

Culture

Traditions
Many of the traditions of the Šokci are influenced by their environment – they live in the fertile Pannonian plain where they cultivate grains and corn in large fields surrounding their villages. The villages often have one main street (šor) where each subsequent family house has auxiliary buildings and a spacious yard, as well as a water well. The central street is surrounded on both sides by water channels, which have small crossings in order for one to reach the house.

Families often keep poultry, particularly ducks and geese, although the main source of meat are the pigs, which are almost inevitably kept by a Šokac. They enjoy pork-based products such as ham, sausages (particularly kulen) and bacon. These products are customarily obtained by the traditional autumn slaughtering. The most common fruit are plums, not least because it is often fermented into liquor called rakija.

The abundance in which they have traditionally lived has made the Šokci a naturally merry people, who pay a lot of attention to folklore. Each Šokac village inevitably has a cultural society where they cultivate their folk songs and dances. A popular folk custom is the bećarac. They also hold a yearly festivity called the "Šokačko sijelo", held over a nine-day period in February, being the largest traditional event in the area of Posavina near Županja, featuring local culture and traditions.

Music
The most recognisable feature of Šokci culture is their music which is played mostly on the tambura instrument. Many tambura bands achieved nationwide fame in Croatia. The body of the tambura was traditionally made of the wood of maple, poplar or plum trees, while today it's mostly made of spruce or fir trees. Another instruments used in the past was the bagpipe. The traditional wedding festivities are paid much attention to, sometimes even catching the attention of entire villages.

Folk costumes
The traditional outfit of the Šokci, called the rubina, is made of white linen cloth with lace decorations, and the main part of it is a blouse called oplećak i krila. The women mostly wear the entire outfit only in the summer, replacing it with a wool skirt in the winter. The most esteemed decoration of a Šokac outfit are the gold coins known as dukati (ducats). A rich Šokac girl would have a large number of dukati weaved onto her chest not only as a decoration but as a clear sign that she comes from a wealthy family.

Prominent individuals 
Ivan Skerlecz, Croatian ban, born in Oroszló
Josip Šokčević, Croatian ban, born in Vinkovci
Mara Švel-Gamiršek, Croatian writer
Matija Antun Relković, Croatian writer, born in Davor
Julijana Matanović, Croatian writer
Josip Kozarac, Croatian writer, born in Vinkovci
Ivan Kozarac, Croatian writer, born in Vinkovci
Ilija Okrugić, Croatian writer, born in Sremski Karlovci
Martin Novoselac, Croatian football player and coach, born in Vinkovci
Ivica Olić, Croatian professional footballer, born in Davor
Ivan Rakitić, Croatian professional footballer, father from Sikirevci
Goran Vlaović, Croatian professional footballer, born in Nova Gradiška
Fabijan Šovagović, Croatian actor, born in Ladimirevci
Flórián Albert, Hungarian football player, European Footballer of the Year in 1967, born in Hercegszántó
Mario Mandžukić, Croatian professional footballer, born in Slavonski Brod

Gallery

See also 

 Bunjevci
 South Slavs
 Busójárás

References

Sources 

 
 
 
 

   Mile Nedeljković: Leksikon naroda sveta, Beograd, 2001.
  Tko su Šokci? (Who are the Šokci?)
   O porijeklu Šokaca, iz knjige "Zagrebačka Šokadija" (On the origin of Šokci, from the book "Šokadija of Zagreb")
  "KOLIKO SE POZNAJEMO?" – brochure of the Vojvodina project "AFIRMACIJA MULTIKULTURALIZMA I TOLERANCIJE U VOJVODINI"

Bačka
Baranya (region)
 
 
Ethnic groups in Bosnia and Herzegovina
Ethnic groups in Croatia
Ethnic groups in Hungary
Ethnic groups in Serbia
Ethnic groups in Vojvodina
Slavic ethnic groups
Slavonia
South Slavs
Syrmia